

The Brochet MB.120 was a two-seat light aircraft developed in France in the 1950s.

Design and development
A derivative of the Brochet MB.70 family, combining the wing of the MB.80 with a modified fuselage of the MB.100 seating two. The design never progressed past a single prototype.

Specifications

References

 
 
 

1950s French sport aircraft
Brochet aircraft
High-wing aircraft
Single-engined tractor aircraft
Aircraft first flown in 1954